Matthew Sean Mason (born 20 March 1974) is an Australian former first-class cricketer. He holds an Irish passport and was therefore not considered an overseas player when playing for Worcestershire County Cricket Club. He played as a right-arm fast-medium bowler, who benefits from his 6-foot 6-inch (1.98 m) height, and a lower-order right-handed batsman.

Mason started his career with Western Australia in 1996–97, and made his senior debut in a February List A win over Tasmania, taking the wicket of Michael di Venuto. Six days later he made his first appearance in first-class cricket in a drawn Sheffield Shield match against Queensland, but could manage only 1-72. He batted as a nightwatchman in his team's second innings, but made just 3 before being bowled by Michael Kasprowicz.

He played another three first-class games and one List A match in 1997–98, but never took more than two wickets in an innings and drifted out of the side. A few years later, Worcestershire coach Tom Moody, who had known Mason since the bowler was a teenager, tried to entice him to New Road to play county cricket, but was turned down; however, a second approach was accepted and Mason became a Worcestershire player in time for the 2002 season.

Mason's first-team experience at Worcester began in the Benson & Hedges Cup, where he took seven wickets in three matches. A number of further one-day games followed, before he was given his County Championship debut against Northamptonshire in July. He responded with six wickets in the match, and kept his place in the first-class side for the rest of the season, taking 5–50 against Nottinghamshire. In the last game of the season in September, he also scored a vital 50 as Worcestershire squeezed past Derbyshire by just one wicket.

2003 saw Mason firmly established in the first team, and he took 53 first-class wickets that year at a fine average of 21.58, as well as 26 wickets at 24.92 in limited-overs cricket. A highlight came in early July, when he took 6–68 in the second innings (and 9–116 in the match) against Durham as Worcestershire recorded a 31-run win. In 2004 he took 52 wickets, albeit at an average slightly over 30, and he passed the 50-wicket mark for the third successive summer in 2005.

He struggled with injuries through 2007 and 2008 before returning to the side and in August 2008, signed a deal with the club which saw him assume the dual role of player and bowling coach in 2009.

Career Best Performances

Updated 24 July 2010

References

External links
 

1974 births
Living people
Australian cricketers
Western Australia cricketers
Worcestershire cricketers
Cricketers from Western Australia
Sportsmen from Western Australia
Australian people of Irish descent